The Parthenope University of Naples is one of the universities located in Naples, Italy.

Historical notes

Now one of the fully accredited universities of Naples, the “Parthenope” University was founded in 1920 as the Regio Istituto Superiore Navale, that is, as the Royal Naval Technical Institute of the Kingdom of Italy. Initially, its purpose was to be a "support" institute for the promotion of studies aimed at improving maritime economy and naval technology.

In the 1930s it was further enlarged and improved, and its name was changed to Istituto Universitario Navale. It played a strategic role during Fascism: the University experts elaborated and calculated the exact and best air routes for the Oceanic trips performed by the Royal Italian Sea Planes, the "Trasvolata Atlantica". Several airplanes, leaving their base in Orbetello, arrived to New York City and, in a second trip, finally come to South America: it was a great technological and political success for the regime. Also, it was at the Istituto Universitario Navale that, during World War II, some scientist developed and realized the first Italian radar; unfortunately the political authorities did not understand the importance of such discovery, stopping the development and thus neglecting the possibility to produce such an instrument.

Notable personalities
Giuseppina Aliverti (geophysicist): developed the Aliverti-Lovera method of measuring the radioactivity of water. 
Federico Cafiero (mathematician): worked as assistant professor to the chair of financial mathematics in 1944.
Renato Caccioppoli (mathematician): worked as professor on the chair of mathematical analysis during the academic years 1942/43 and 1952/53.
Carlo Miranda (mathematician): worked as professor on the chair of mathematical analysis during the academic years 1943/44 and 1955/56.
Mauro Picone (mathematician): worked as professor on the chair of mathematical analysis during the academic year 1926/27.

The university campuses

The main premises of the “Parthenope” University are located directly in the front of the passenger port of Naples. Additionally, “Parthenope” has acquired classrooms buildings on the Posillipo coast and in the former church of San Giorgio dei Genovesi, located in the centre of Naples. An additional location is under preparation at the new civic centre, the Centro Direzionale. With the increased extension and completion of main facilities and its final accreditation as a full university, the current student population of the Parthenope University is about 15,000 units.

Organization

The university is divided into 5 departments:

 Economics
 Engineering
 Law
 Exercise and Sports Science
 Sciences and Technology

See also 
 List of Italian universities
 Naples

References
. "Mathematicians at the Istituto Universitario Navale (1926 – 1976)" (English translation of the title), is a booklet collecting brief biographical sketches and bibliographies of the scientific works produced by the mathematicians who taught at the Parthenope University of Naples during their stay.

External links
 Parthenope University of Naples Website
 Wikipedia Italian page
 Tlcparthenope 

 
Educational institutions established in 1930
1930 establishments in Italy